Lanquidity is a 1978 studio album by American jazz musician Sun Ra.

Music 
The album was recorded by Bob Blank at Blank Studios, entirely on the night of July 17, 1978, following a performance on Saturday Night Live.

Stylistically, the album is markedly different from Sun Ra's earlier recordings, drawing heavily on funk, R&B and jazz fusion. Lanquidity is also unusual in featuring two guitarists, which were seldom used in the Arkestra. "That's How I Feel" features a tenor sax solo by John Gilmore, Sun Ra's sideman from the 1950s until Sun Ra's death in 1993.

Critical reception
Spin magazine called Lanquidity "a beautiful place to enter Ra's psych-jazz omniverse", while Alternative Press wrote that it is "impossibly funky": "Often compared to Miles Davis' heaviest jazz-rock-funk fusion, Lanquidity is dense, rhythmic and curiously hypnotic". Music journalist Robert Christgau is a fan of the album.

Reissues 
The album was first released in 1978 with a reflective foil silver cover. In 2000, it was reissued on HDCD by Evidence Records, with a light grey cover.

In 2021, Strut announced a reissue of the album. Four editions were made available: a remastered version of the original album on digital and as a single LP, and a "Special Edition" version as a 2xCD and 4xLP box set, including rare alternate mixes by Bob Blank. In addition, record club Vinyl Me, Please. pressed a limited run of 750 copies of the single-LP version on red vinyl.

Track listing 

The 2021 "Special Edition" contains the above tracks, followed by Bob Blank's alternate mixes (with the same sequencing) for a total of ten songs.

Personnel 
Sun Ra: organ, synthesizer, piano, arranger, keyboards, Hammond organ, electric piano, vocals, bells, Arp, Fender Rhodes, orchestra bells, Mini Moog
John Gilmore: tenor saxophone
Danny Ray Thompson: flute, baritone saxophone
Eddie Gale: trumpet
Michael Ray: trumpet, flugelhorn
Marshall Allen: flute, oboe, alto saxophone
Luqman Ali: percussion
Michael Anderson: percussion 
Artaukatune: drums, tympani
Disco Kid: ( Slo Johnson ) guitar
Dale Williams: guitar
Atakatun Odun: congas
Elo Omoe: Flute, bass clarinet
Julian Pressley: baritone saxophone
Richard Williams: bass
James Jacson: oboe, basson, flute, voices
June Tyson: voices

References

External links 
 Extensive Sun Ra discography

1978 albums
Sun Ra albums
Evidence Music albums
Philly Jazz albums